Hacıəhmədli (also, Gadzhyakhmedli and Khadzhi-Akhmedli) is a village and municipality in the Barda Rayon of Azerbaijan.  It has a population of 223.

References 

Populated places in Barda District